Matfield is a village in Kent, England.

Matfield may also refer to:

 Matfield Township, Chase County, Kansas
 Matfield River, Massachusetts
 Victor Matfield (born 1977), South African rugby player